The Thurston High School shooting occurred on May 21, 1998, at Thurston High School in Springfield, Oregon. 15-year-old freshman student Kipland Kinkel, who had been scheduled to appear at an expulsion hearing the day prior, murdered his parents before killing two of his classmates and wounding 25 others. The shooting ended when a group of students managed to subdue Kinkel, leading to his arrest. Kinkel pled guilty to murder and attempted murder and was sentenced to 111 years in prison without the possibility of parole. He is currently incarcerated at the Oregon State Correctional Institution.

Events leading to shooting

Expulsion

On May 20, 1998, 15-year-old Kinkel was suspended pending an expulsion hearing from Thurston High School in Springfield, Oregon, for being in possession of a loaded, stolen handgun. A friend of Kinkel's had stolen a pistol from the father of one of his friends and arranged to sell the weapon to Kinkel the night before. Kinkel paid $110 for the Beretta Model 90 .32-caliber pistol loaded with a nine-round magazine, which he then placed in a paper bag and left in his locker. When the father discovered he was missing a handgun, he reported it to the police and supplied the names of students he believed might have stolen the firearm. Kinkel's name was not on the list. The school became aware of his possible involvement and questioned him. When he was checked for weapons, he reportedly stated: "Look, I'm gonna be square with you guys; the gun's in my locker." Kinkel was suspended pending an expulsion hearing, and he and his friend were arrested. Kinkel was released from police custody and driven home by his father.

Murder of parents
At home that afternoon, Kinkel was told by his father that he would be sent to military school if he did not improve his behavior. According to Kinkel's taped confession, at about 3:00 p.m., his father was seated at the kitchen counter drinking coffee. Kinkel retrieved his Ruger .22-caliber semi-automatic rifle from his bedroom and ammunition from his parents' bedroom. He then went to the kitchen and shot his father once in the back of the head, then dragged his body into the bathroom and covered it with a sheet. Kinkel further stated that his mother arrived home at about 6:30 p.m., and that he met her in the garage, told her he loved her, then shot her twice in the back of the head, three times in the face, and once in the heart. He then dragged her body across the floor and covered it with a sheet.

Throughout the next morning, Kinkel repeatedly played a recording of "Liebestod", the final dramatic aria from Wagner's opera Tristan und Isolde, on the family's sound system. The recording was featured in the 1996 film Romeo + Juliet, and included on the compact disc (CD) of the film's soundtrack. When police arrived at the house, they found "opera music" from the soundtrack playing loudly with the CD player set to continuous play. In a note Kinkel left on a coffee table in the living room, he described his motive for killing his parents thus: "I just got two felonies on my record. My parents can't take that! It would destroy them. The embarrassment would be too much for them. They couldn't live with themselves." But as the note continues, he attempts to describe his mental state: "My head just doesn't work right. God damn these VOICES inside my head. ... I have to kill people. I don't know why. ... I have no other choice."

Shooting 

On May 21, Kinkel drove his mother's Ford Explorer to the high school. He wore a trench coat to hide the five weapons he carried: two hunting knives, his rifle, a 9×19mm Glock 19 pistol, and a .22-caliber Ruger MK II pistol. He was carrying 1,127 rounds of ammunition.

Kinkel parked on 61st Street, two blocks from the school, then jogged to the campus, entered the patio area and fired two shots, one fatally wounding 16-year-old Ben Walker and the other wounding Ryan Atteberry. He went to the cafeteria and, walking across it, fired the remaining 48 rounds from his rifle, wounding 24 students and fatally wounding 17-year-old Mikael Nickolauson. Kinkel fired a total of 50 rounds, 37 of which struck students, and killed two. 300 students were present during the event.

When Kinkel's rifle ran out of ammunition and he began to reload, wounded student Jacob Ryker tackled him, assisted by several other students. Kinkel drew the Glock from his belt and fired one shot before he was disarmed, injuring Ryker again as well as another student. He yelled at the students, "Just kill me!" The students restrained Kinkel until the police arrived and arrested him. A total of seven students were involved in subduing and disarming Kinkel. In custody, Kinkel retrieved a knife that was secured on his leg and attacked a police officer, begging to be fatally shot. The officer subdued him with pepper spray.

Nickolauson died at the scene; Walker died after being transported to the hospital and kept on life support until his parents arrived. The other students, including Ryker, were also taken to the hospital with a variety of wounds. Ryker had a perforated lung, but he made a full recovery. He received the Boy Scouts of America Honor Medal with Crossed Palms for his heroism on the day of the attack.

Relief and aftermath 
In the wake of the shooting, over 200 counselors volunteered and over $400,000 of aid money was given in the form of the Thurston Healing Fund. A scholarship was created for Thurston High School graduates in remembrance of the shooting. In 2003, a permanent memorial was created and dedicated at Thurston High School in memory of the event—the Thurston Memorial.

Perpetrator

Kipland Phillip Kinkel (born August 30, 1982), is the second child of William and Faith (née Zuranski) Kinkel. He has an older sister, Kristin. His parents were both Spanish teachers. Faith taught Spanish at Springfield High School, and William taught at Thurston High School and Lane Community College.

There was a widespread history of serious mental illnesses in both sides of the family. The parents concealed this from psychologists.

According to all accounts, Kinkel's parents were loving and supportive. His sister Kristin was a gifted student. The Kinkel family spent a sabbatical year in Spain when Kip was six, where he attended a Spanish-speaking kindergarten. Kinkel reportedly attended in an "unnormal" way, and his family said that he struggled with the curriculum. When Kinkel returned to Oregon, he attended elementary school in the small community of Walterville, about five miles east of Springfield. His teachers considered him immature and lacking physical and emotional development. Based on the recommendation of his teachers, Kinkel's parents had him repeat the first grade. In the repeat, he was diagnosed with dyslexia, which became worse, and he was placed in extensive special education classes by the beginning of second grade.

Kinkel had an interest in firearms and explosives from an early age. His father initially discouraged this, but later enrolled him at gun safety courses, buying him a .22 caliber rifle and eventually a 9mm Glock handgun at the age of 15.

Classmates described Kinkel as strange and morbid. Others characterized him as psychotic or schizoid, and as someone who enjoyed listening to rock bands such as Nine Inch Nails, Rage Against the Machine, and Marilyn Manson. He constantly talked about committing acts of violence, telling friends that he wanted to join the U.S. Army after graduation to find out what it was like to kill someone. When asked about a family trip to Disneyland, he commented that he wanted to "punch Mickey Mouse in the nose." He once gave a "how-to" speech in bomb-making to his speech class and set off "stink bombs" in the lockers of classmates. Kinkel studied William Shakespeare's Romeo & Juliet in his English class and related with the protagonists, and became enamored with the 1996 modernized film adaptation, which featured heavy use of firearms.

Kinkel's parents enrolled him in anger management and had him evaluated by psychologists. Shortly before being murdered, Kinkel's father confided to a friend that he was "terrified" and had run out of options to help his son.

Kinkel exhibited signs of paranoid schizophrenia, the full extent of which became apparent only after his trial. He had gone to great lengths to hide any symptoms due to a fear of being labelled abnormal or "mentally retarded". His doctors later said that Kinkel had told them of hearing voices in his head from the age of 12; he eventually had  hallucinations and paranoid delusions — including the belief that the government had implanted a computer chip in his brain and that the Chinese were going to invade the West Coast. Kinkel described three voices: "Voice A", who commanded Kinkel to commit violent acts, "Voice B", who repeated insulting and depressive statements at the expense of Kinkel, and "Voice C", who constantly echoed what A and B said. Kinkel claimed that he felt punished by God for being subjected to these voices, and that it was Voice A who instigated the killing of his father, mother, and the subsequent attack at Thurston High School.

Trial and imprisonment
At the police station, Kinkel lunged at Officer Al Warthen with his knife, screaming, "Shoot me, kill me!" The officer repelled Kinkel with pepper spray. Kinkel later said that he wanted to trick the officer into shooting him, and that he had wanted to die by suicide after killing his parents but could not bring himself to do so.

At his sentencing, the defense presented experts on mental health to show that the assailant was mentally ill. Jeffrey Hicks, the only psychologist who had treated Kinkel before the shootings, said that he was in satisfactory mental health. He had seen Kinkel for nine sessions and treated him for major depression. The boy's parents terminated the therapy because Kinkel was responding well to treatment and ceased to show symptoms of depression.

On September 24, 1999, three days before jury selection was set to begin, Kinkel pleaded guilty to murder and attempted murder, forgoing the possibility of being acquitted by reason of insanity. In November 1999, Kinkel was sentenced to more than 111 years in prison without the possibility of parole. At sentencing, Kinkel apologized to the court for the murder of his parents and the shooting spree.

Appeals
In June 2007, Kinkel sought a new trial, saying that his previous attorneys should have taken the case to trial and used the insanity defense. Two psychiatrists testified that Kinkel exhibited signs of paranoid schizophrenia at the time of the shooting. In August 2007, a Marion County judge denied him a new trial. Kinkel appealed, arguing among other things that he had had ineffective assistance of counsel during the trial proceedings. On January 12, 2011, the Oregon Court of Appeals affirmed the trial court judgment, denying his motion for a new trial. Kinkel has appealed his sentence in both federal and state courts. In federal court he claimed his guilty plea should not have been accepted without a prior mental health evaluation. In state court, Kinkel challenged the validity of the virtual life sentence he was given, citing Miller v. Alabama.

Kinkel is incarcerated at the Oregon State Correctional Institution in Salem. He received his GED while serving a portion of his ‘life sentence’ at MacLaren Youth Correctional Facility in Woodburn. On June 11, 2007, Kinkel, nearing his 25th birthday (the maximum age to be held as a juvenile in Oregon), was transferred from the Oregon Youth Authority, MacLaren Correctional Facility, to the Oregon State Correctional Institution, where he currently resides, with Oregon Department of Corrections SID number 12975669.

See also

 Columbine High School massacre (1999)
 Stoneman Douglas High School shooting, the deadliest high school shooting in American history
 List of school shootings in the United States (before 2000)

References

Further reading

External links

 "Kipland Kinkel." CourtTV.
 Logman, Jere. "Shootings in a Schoolhouse; Wounded Teen-Ager Is Called a Hero." The New York Times. May 23, 1998.

1998 in Oregon
1998 mass shootings in the United States
1998 murders in the United States
Incidents of violence against boys
Attacks in the United States in 1998
Crime in Oregon
Deaths by firearm in Oregon
High school shootings in the United States
Mass shootings in Oregon
Mass shootings in the United States
May 1998 events in the United States
Murder in Oregon
Parricides
School massacres in the United States
School shootings committed by pupils
Spree shootings in the United States
Springfield, Oregon